Robert Riggs may refer to:

 Robert Riggs (tennis) (1918–1995), tennis player
 Robert E. Riggs (1927–2014), American law professor
 Robert Riggs, illustrator, Society of Illustrators' Hall of Fame
 Robert "Freeze" Riggs, former Club Kid and drug dealer, convicted of the murder of Andre "Angel" Melendez